Evelyn is a 2018 documentary directed by and starring Orlando von Einsiedel. The premise revolves around Orlando's own family dealing with the effects of a suicide committed 13 years earlier by Orlando's brother Evelyn, by taking a series of long walks visiting landscapes Evelyn liked to walk when he was still alive.

It was released Netflix on 10 September 2019.

Cast
 Evelyn Einsiedel, posthumously
 Orlando von Einsiedel
 Gwendolyn (Gwennie) Einsiedel
 Robin (Robbie) Einiedel
 Harriet Einsiedel (aka Beta)
 Andreas von Einsiedel
 Johanna Thornycroft
 Leon Oldstrong
 Jack Binney

Camerawork and music
For large parts of the film, the camerawork appears to require an operator walking backwards. In fact the cameraman, Franklin Dow, had created a special camera rig that sat on his back with a stabilising mechanism. A screen in front allowed him to watch what was happening as the family/cast members walked behind chatting.

The musical score was mostly composed by Patrick Jonsson who had previously collaborated with von Einsiedel on Virunga and The White Helmets. One song was contributed by Evelyn's sister Gwendolyn Einsiedel, a musician in her own right who remembers singing almost every day during the making of the film, though very little made it onto the final cut.

Release
Evelyn premiered at the 2018 London Film Festival. It screened on BBC Two on 18 May 2019 and was released from 10 September 2019 on Netflix. Reviewers described the film as a raw, powerful look at a family trying to make sense of suicide. It was chosen as Best Documentary in the British Independent Film Awards of 2018.

Outreach
Some reviewers have suggested that the film might be powerful enough to save the lives of those considering suicide, GQ pointing out that suicide is now the single biggest killer of young British men and suggesting that Evelyn might help break the code of silence that tends to surround the subject. The film's website provides support links to help services including The Samaritans and Calm and reproduces a poem from The Smoke Jumper by Nicholas Evans, best known as author of The Horse Whisperer (novel).

See also

 Suicide in the United Kingdom

References

External links
 https://www.evelynmovie.com
 
 
 

2018 documentary films
2018 films
Documentary films about suicide
Netflix original documentary films
Suicide in the United Kingdom
2010s English-language films